Immolation may refer to:
Death by burning
Self-immolation, the act of burning oneself
Immolation (band), a death metal band from Yonkers, New York
The Immolation, a 1977 novel by Goh Poh Seng
Dance Dance Immolation, an interactive performance piece using a modified Dance Dance Revolution
"Brünnhilde's Immolation Scene", the closing scene of Richard Wagner's opera Götterdämmerung

fr:Immolation